Chhangur Ram (born at Village - Katain, Azamgarh) was an Indian politician for the Lalganj (Lok Sabha Constituency) in Uttar Pradesh. He died on 16 June 2005.

External links
 Official biographical sketch in Parliament of India website
 BIOGRAPHICAL SKETCH OF SEVENTH LOK SABHA(State wise)

2005 deaths
Politicians from Azamgarh district
India MPs 1980–1984
Samajwadi Party politicians
Lok Sabha members from Uttar Pradesh
1932 births
Samajwadi Party politicians from Uttar Pradesh